Stars of Erin GAA is a Gaelic Athletic Association club based in the Glencullen/Stepaside areas of Dún Laoghaire–Rathdown within the traditional County Dublin.

The club has adult football and ladies football teams and underage teams at various levels.

Honours
 Dublin Junior D Football Championship: Winners 2010
 Dublin AFL Div. 8: Winners 2010

References

External links
Official Club Website
Dublin Club GAA
Dublin GAA

Gaelic games clubs in Dún Laoghaire–Rathdown
Gaelic football clubs in Dún Laoghaire–Rathdown